Ralph Hamilton Crake  (13 April 1882 – 26 January 1952) was a Scottish first-class cricketer and British Army officer.

The son of the merchant and footballer William Crake, he was born in British India at Madras. He was educated in England at Harrow School, where he played for the school cricket team. Having left Harrow in 1900, Crake played a single first-class cricket match for the Marylebone Cricket Club (MCC) against Nottinghamshire at Lord's in 1901. He scored 8 runs in the MCC first innings and a single run in their second innings, being dismissed on both occasions by John Gunn.

After completing his education, he attended the Royal Military College, Sandhurst. He graduated from that school in May 1901, and was commissioned as a second lieutenant in the King's Own Scottish Borderers. Soon after being commissioned he went to South Africa, where he saw action with the 1st battalion of his regiment in the Second Boer War. He was promoted to lieutenant in September 1905, with promotion to captain following in November 1908. He was station in Egypt in 1909, where he played minor cricket matches for the Egyptian cricket team. Crake served in the First World War, seeing action during the Mesopotamian campaign from 1915 to 1918. He gained promotion to major in May 1916, while in August of the same year he was made an acting lieutenant colonel while commanding a battalion. He relinquished his acting rank in October 1916, but was once again made an acting lieutenant colonel in August 1917. Crake was awarded the Distinguished Service Order in February 1918.

Following the war, he served in British India. While there, he made his second appearance in first-class cricket, after a gap of nearly twenty years, for the Europeans cricket team against the Parsees at Bombay in the Bombay Quadrangular in November 1920. Batting twice during the match, he made scores of 37 in the Europeans first innings and 1 in their second innings, being dismissed on both occasions by M. B. Vatcha.

Crake was promoted to the full rank of lieutenant colonel in July 1930, before being placed on the half-pay list in July 1934. He retired from active service in January 1935. Crake was appointed a deputy lieutenant of Berwickshire in April 1937. During the Second World War he assisted the Army Cadet Force at Roxburgh. Crake died at Edinburgh in January 1952. His brother, Eric, was also a first-class cricketer.

References

External links

1882 births
1952 deaths
People from Chennai
People educated at Harrow School
Scottish cricketers
Marylebone Cricket Club cricketers
King's Own Scottish Borderers officers
British Army personnel of the Second Boer War
British Army personnel of World War I
Companions of the Distinguished Service Order
Europeans cricketers
Deputy Lieutenants of Berwickshire